Iron Warrior is 1987 film directed by Alfonso Brescia.

Plot
Ator The Fighting Eagle returns again, sans sidekick Thong, to the legendary realm of Dragor to do battle with Phoedra, an evil sorceress. Her main weapon is an unstoppable warrior, known as the Master of the Sword, who continuously battles Ator to a draw, until finally revealing his secret connection to the Blademaster.

Cast
 Miles O'Keeffe as Ator
 Savina Gersak as Princess Janna
 Elisabeth Kaza as Phoedra
 Tiziana Altieri as Young Phoedra
 Anna Cachia as Seductress (uncredited)
 Iris Peynado as Deeva
 Tim Lane as King
 Franco Daddi as Trogar
 Josie Coppini as King Impostor
 Malcolm Borg as Young Ator
 Conrad Borg as Young Trogar
 Jon Rosser as Nekron

Production
Iron Warrior was the third film in the Ator series. It was shot on location on Gozo island in Malta with interiors shot in Mediterranean Film Studios in Malta. Iron Warrior was shot in 1985.

Release
Iron Warrior was released in Italy on 1 January 1987 and in the United States on 9 January.

Reception
From contemporary reviews, a reviewer credited as "Lor." of Variety reviewed the film on March 21, 1987. "Lor." referred to the film as lifting equal amounts from both the Star Wars and Indiana Jones films and had poor derivative music from Star Trek II: The Wrath of Khan. "Lor." stated that O'Keeffe is embarrassing, posing instead of acting and like the rest of the cast, stuck with a funny looking punk-influenced hairdo.

References

Footnotes

Sources

External links 
 
 
 

1987 films
Ator
Films directed by Alfonso Brescia
Films scored by Carlo Maria Cordio
1987 fantasy films
1980s Italian-language films
English-language Italian films
1980s English-language films
Sword and sorcery films
Peplum films
Sword and sandal films
1987 multilingual films
Italian multilingual films
1980s Italian films